The 2022–23 season is the 137th season in the existence of Shrewsbury Town Football Club and the club's eighth consecutive season in League One. In addition to the league, they will also compete in the 2022–23 FA Cup, the 2022–23 EFL Cup and the 2022–23 EFL Trophy.

Transfers

In

Out

Loans in

Loans out

Pre-season and friendlies
On May 27, Shrewsbury Town announced a week training camp in Spain between 2–7 July, before returning to face AFC Telford United on 12 July. Three days later a home friendly against Cardiff City was confirmed. On 24 June, a further two additions to the pre-season schedule was confirmed, against Qatar SC and Burnley.

Competitions

Overall record

League One

League table

Results summary

Results by round

Matches

On 23 June, the league fixtures were announced.

FA Cup

Shrewsbury were drawn at home to York City in the first round the winners off Peterborough United versus Salford City in the second round and to Sunderland in the third round.

EFL Cup

The Shrews were drawn at home to Carlisle United in the first round and to Burnley in the second round.

EFL Trophy

On 20 June, the initial Group stage draw was made, grouping Shrewsbury Town with Port Vale and Stockport County. Three days later, Wolverhampton Wanderers U21s joined Northern Group C.

References

Shrewsbury Town
Shrewsbury Town F.C. seasons